Hells Canyon Wilderness is a 9,951 acre (4,027 ha) wilderness area in the U.S. state of Arizona. It is located approximately 25 miles (40 km) northwest of Phoenix in Maricopa and southeast Yavapai counties.

Topography
Hells Canyon Wilderness is a portion of the Hieroglyphic Mountains.

Private Land
On Earth Day, 2008, The Wilderness Land Trust purchased a  inholding near the center of Hells Canyon Wilderness. The parcel included Hells Canyon itself and had belonged to a Phoenix area land developer. Once the Trust transfers the land to the federal government the entire wilderness area will be publicly owned.

Vegetation
Most of Hells Canyon Wilderness is covered by Sonoran desert shrub vegetation such as saguaro cactus, paloverde, barrel cactus, ocotillo, and various desert grasses.

Recreation
Popular recreational activities in Hells Canyon Wilderness include rock climbing, hiking, wildlife watching, and camping.

See also
 Bradshaw Mountains
 Castle Hot Springs (Arizona)
 List of Arizona Wilderness Areas
 List of U.S. Wilderness Areas
 Wilderness Act

References

External links
 Hells Canyon Wilderness – Bureau of Land Management
 The Wilderness Land Trust

Bureau of Land Management areas in Arizona
IUCN Category Ib
Protected areas of Maricopa County, Arizona
Protected areas of Yavapai County, Arizona
Wilderness areas of Arizona
1990 establishments in Arizona
Protected areas established in 1990